Chase Masterson (born Christianne Carafano on February 26, 1963) is an American actress and singer.

Early life
Chase Masterson was born Christianne Carafano in Colorado Springs, Colorado. As her father was in the Army, she grew up in several places, among them West Haven, Connecticut and three years in Germany. Her family settled in El Paso, Texas when she was in the sixth grade. Masterson graduated from the University of Texas and has one child.

Career

Acting
Masterson's first major role came in 1994 as Ivy Lief on General Hospital. She then spent five years portraying the Bajoran Dabo girl Leeta on Star Trek: Deep Space Nine from 1995 to 1999. Her prominent feature film roles include starring as a sultry singer in James Kerwin's sci-fi film noir Yesterday Was a Lie, which she also produced, and voicing Janice Em in the animated film Robotech: The Shadow Chronicles. Her television guest-starring roles include ER and Sliders; in the latter, her role was that of Kelly Welles, the sister of Wade Welles.

Masterson hosted an Entertainment Tonight-style news program for the Sci-Fi Channel in the 1990s called Sci-Fi Entertainment and an Internet-based radio talk show for the website The Fandom in 2004–2005.

Since 2010, Masterson has reprised her role as Leeta from Deep Space Nine, both in hologram form and in her "mirror universe" guise, in Cryptic Studios' Star Trek Online. After Masterson appeared in two Doctor Who audio adventures from Big Finish Productions, it was announced on October 19, 2012, that she would star in her own spin-off series, Vienna, as "impossibly glamorous bounty hunter" Vienna Salvatori.

Masterson is voicing the title character "Auto" in monochrom's science fiction comedy film Je Suis Auto (release 2023). The film is a farcical comedy that deals with issues such as AI, politics of labor, and tech culture.

Singer and live performer
Masterson has released two commercial records: 2011's Yesterday Was a Lie and 2012's Burned With Desire. In addition, she has released several independent jazz CDs: Thrill of the Chase, whose title is a play on her stage name, the follow-up EP AD ASTRA! (Latin for To the Stars!), the limited edition Crystal Anniversary: Songs from the Holosuite in honor of Star Trek: Deep Space Nine's fifteenth anniversary, and the "greatest hits" compilation Jazz Cocktail.

Masterson was special guest star at the 20th anniversary edition of cocktail robot festival Roboexotica in Vienna and performed a live jazz set for "robots and humans".

Film producer
Masterson was named Best Feature Film Producer of 2008 by the LA Femme Film Festival for her work as producer of the mystery/drama Yesterday Was a Lie.

Advocacy
In 2013, Masterson, who experienced bullying herself while in school, co-founded the Pop Culture Hero Coalition, a non-profit organization speaking out against "bullying, racism, misogyny, cyber-bullying, LGBT-bullying, and other forms of hate."

Public image
In 2004, as a result of her genre work, Masterson was named one of the world's "50 Sexiest Women" by the men's magazine Femme Fatales, and the "Favorite Science Fiction Actress on Television" in a TV Guide reader's poll. In December 2009, AOL named her one of the "Ten Sexiest Aliens on TV", reporting that Masterson is "regularly voted the most popular guest at Star Trek conventions."

Lawsuit against Matchmaker.com
Following a series of stalking incidents instigated by a man in Berlin, Masterson – under her birth name of Christianne Carafano – was the petitioner in Carafano v. Metrosplash.com, an online dating service, formerly Matchmaker.com, on which the man had created a fictitious dating profile that contained Masterson's home address, telephone number, four photographs of her, and a description of her that characterized her as licentious. As a result, she received a series of unwanted communications, including obscene telephone calls. When the matter was brought to the attention of Matchmaker.com, that service refused to remove the profile. Masterson then sued Matchmaker.com for defamation, invasion of privacy, misappropriation of the right of publicity and negligence. The United States Court of Appeals for the Ninth Circuit ruled against Masterson, deciding the man who created the profile was responsible for it, and not Matchmaker.com. The court cited Communications Decency Act, which states that "No provider or user of an interactive computer service shall be treated as the publisher or speaker of any information provided by another information content provider."

Discography 
 Yesterday Was a Lie (2011)
 "Burned With Desire" (2012)

Filmography

Source:

References

External links

 
 
 
 
 
 Pop Culture Hero Coalition founders' page

1963 births
Living people
20th-century American actresses
21st-century American actresses
Actresses from Colorado
American film actresses
American women jazz singers
American jazz singers
American soap opera actresses
American television actresses
American voice actresses
Actresses from Colorado Springs, Colorado
Musicians from Colorado Springs, Colorado
Singers from Colorado
Jazz musicians from Colorado